Looxcie was a mobile-connected, handsfree, streaming video camera created by Looxcie, Inc., a privately owned Sunnyvale, California company. The Looxcie video camera was named a top 50 best invention of 2010 by Time Magazine (November 2010), and LooxcieLive, their live streaming video service, was named as a top 100 best innovation of 2011 by Popular Science (December 2011).

History
 September 2008 – the company is formed and venture financed 
.
 September 2010 – the company sells its first camcorder Looxcie 1, and releases its first mobile app LooxcieMoments.
 December 2010 – the company releases its LooxcieCam mobile app.
 June 2011 – the company launches its second generation camcorder Looxcie 2.
 October 2011 – the company introduces hands-free accessories for Looxcie 2.
 November 2011 – the company releases LooxcieLive live video streaming service.
February 2012 – the company announces joint-development partnership with Taser International, Inc., who releases the AXON Flex product line. The AXON Flex features Looxcie technology.
January 2014 – Company announces shift of focus from consumer to enterprise products (Vidcie)
April 2014 – Company announces it will "Close down the consumer line of cameras, services, and support for the current Looxcie customers and partners."

Mobile-connected streaming video cameras
Looxcie is a mobile-connected, handsfree, streaming video camera that facilitates live video streaming and capture. The live video streaming is designed for real-time sharing. Video clips can be saved on the camera and shared via a mobile device or uploaded to a computer.

Looxcie video cameras are compatible with Android (2.1+) and iOS (4.2.6+) devices. Looxcie utilizes a dual processor system for simultaneous video capture, wireless streaming and phone calls via Bluetooth. The Looxcie maximizes battery life (up to 4 hours) and optimizes video for viewing (480p) and mobile sharing (320p) in a small wearable, ergonomic form factor.

Looxcie 2
Looxcie 2 features an adjustable fit system with attachment accessories. Looxcie 2 weighs 22g (0.78 oz) and comes in two configurations: up to 5 hour video storage model and up to 10 hour video storage model.

Looxcie 1
Looxcie 1 weighs less than 28g (0.99 oz) and provides up to 5 hour video storage.

Accessories for Looxcie 2
For sports and outdoors: helmet strap mount, vented helmet mount, ball cap clip, bike mount
For the car: windshield mount, car visor mount
Lenses: 180° fisheye Lens, 2X zoom telephoto lens, wide angle and macro lens
Essentials: carrying case, wall charger, tripod, tripod head

Mobile apps
Looxcie companion apps are available for download from LooxcieDesktop, the App Store and Play Store (Android Market).

LooxcieLive
LooxcieLive lets users stream live video and view other people’s broadcasts in real-time. Push-to-Talk and Text Chat features allow viewers to dialog with the broadcaster while they live stream. Video streaming auto-adapts based on network capabilities – 3G, 4G or Wi-Fi.

LooxcieMoments
LooxcieMoments allows users to continuously record video into a looping buffer. With the Instant Clip button on Looxcie, users can reach back and save the last 30-seconds of an event, which can then be shared to social networks and email.

LooxcieCam
LooxcieCam provides users with basic camcorder functionality.

See also 

 EyeTap
 GoPro
 Google Glass
 Glasshole
 SixthSense
 Sousveillance
 Vuzix

References

External links
 looxcie.com
 LooxcieDesktop utility

Webcams